Margaret M Auton (born 9 February 1951) is a female British former swimmer.

Swimming career
Auton competed in three events at the 1968 Summer Olympics. She was in the medley relay and they were placed sixth. She competed with Dorothy Harrison, Wendy Burrell and Alexandra Jackson. At the ASA National British Championships she won the 110 yards butterfly title in 1968 and 1969  and the 220 yards butterfly title in 1968.

References

1951 births
Living people
British female swimmers
Olympic swimmers of Great Britain
Swimmers at the 1968 Summer Olympics
Sportspeople from Hartlepool
20th-century British women